Morris Chapel is an unincorporated community in Hardin County, Tennessee, in the southwestern part of the state. Morris Chapel is the hometown of former baseball pitcher Jim Hardin.

Unincorporated communities in Hardin County, Tennessee
Unincorporated communities in Tennessee